Asura carnea is a moth of the  family Erebidae. It is found in China.

References

carnea
Moths described in 1886
Moths of Asia